The 1925 Dayton Flyers football team was an American football team that represented the University of Dayton as an independent during the 1925 college football season. In its third season under head coach Harry Baujan, the team compiled a 7–2 record and shut out five of nine opponents. Louis Mahrt was the team captain.  At the end of the season, the Dayton Daily News called the team "the best in the history of the school." The team played its home games at the newly built University of Dayton Stadium in Dayton, Ohio.

Schedule

References

Dayton
Dayton Flyers football seasons
Dayton Flyers football